This is the list of Ministers of Railway Transport of the Russian Empire, Ministers of Railway of the Soviet Union,  Ministers of Railway Transport of the Russian Federation and Ministers of Transport of the Russian Federation.

Imperial Russia
Prince Peter Friedrich Georg of Holstein and Oldenburg (1809–1812) 
Franz Devolant (1812–1818)
Agustín de Betancourt (1819–1822)
Duke Alexander of Württemberg (1822–1833)
Karl Wilhelm von Toll (1833–1842)
Pyotr Kleinmichel (1842–1855)
Konstantin Chevkin (1855–1862)
Pavel Melnikov (1862–1869)
Vladimir Bobrinsky (1869–1871)
Alexei Bobrinsky (1871–1874)
Konstantin Posyet (1874–1888)
Hermann von Paucker (1888–1889)
Adolf von Hübbenent (1889–1892)
Sergei Witte (February–August, 1892)
Apollon Krivoshein (1892–1894)
Prince Mikhail Khilkoff (1895–1905)
Klavdiy Nemeshayev (1905–1906)
Nikolai Shafgauzen-Shenberg-Ek-Shaufus (1906–1909)
Sergei Rukhlov (1909–1915)
Alexander Trepov (1915–1916)
Eduard Kriger-Voinovsky (1916–1917)
Nikolai Nekrasov (March 2, 1917 – July 4, 1917)
Georgi Takhtamyshev (July 11–24, 1917)
Pyotr Yurenev (July 25 – August 31, 1917)
Alexander Liverovsky (August 31 - October 25, 1917)

Russian SFSR and Soviet Union

Mark Yelizarov (October 28, 1917 – February 1918)
Aleksey Rogov (February – May, 1918)
Pyotr Kobozev (May – July, 1918)
Vladimir Nevsky (July 1918 – March 1919)
Leonid Krasin (1919-1920)
Leon Trotsky (March 25 - December 10, 1920)
Alexander Yemshanov (December 10, 1920 - 1921)
Felix Dzerzhinsky (1921-1924)
Yan Rudzutak (1924-1930)
Moisey Rukhimovich (June 11 – October 2, 1931)
Andrei Andreyev (1931–1935)
Lazar Kaganovich (1935–1937, 1938–1942, 1943–1947)
Alexei Bakulin (1937–1938)
Andrey Khrulyov (1942–1943)
Ivan Kovalyov (1944–1948)
Boris Beschev (1948–1956)
Gleb Kolesnikov ( 1956 - 1982)
Nikolai Konaryov (1982–1991)
Leonid Matyukhin (May 8 – November 26, 1991)

Russian Federation

Ministers of Railways
Gennady Fadeyev (November 26, 1991 – August 22 1996, January 4, 2002 – September 22, 2003)
Anatoly Zaytsev (August 22, 1996 – April 14, 1997)
Nikolai Aksyonenko (April 14, 1997 – May 21, 1999, September 16, 1999 – January 3, 2002)
Vladimir Starostenko (May 29 – September 16, 1999)
Vadim Morozov (October 7, 2003 – March 9, 2004)

Ministers of Transport

External links
 Ministry of Transport of the Russian Federation

 
Government of Russia
Ministers of Transport
Lists of government ministers of the Soviet Union